A term that appeared on automotive bills of sale prior to the 1971. It appeared as the initialism E.O.H. and referred mostly to the excise tax on automobiles built for highway use and was used to pay for the expanding highway system.  It also referred to operating overhead in selling the vehicle and handling charges.

During the 50s the tax was 10% of the wholesale price of the vehicle and was used for highway construction. It was reduced to 6 and 7% during the 60s and then repealed in 1971.

There was also a 2.5% dealer holdback that was paid to the dealer from the factory when the car was sold.

External links
1953 Cadillac Eldorado Bill of Sale - An example of the use of E.O.H.
1956 Nash Metropolitan Pricing - Another example of E.O.H.
Federal Tax Rates on Automobiles - Changes to automotive taxation over time

Excises